The 2002–03 Northern Premier League season was the 35th in the history of the Northern Premier League, a football competition in England. Teams were divided into two divisions; the Premier and the First.

Premier Division

The Premier League featured three new teams:

 Stalybridge Celtic relegated from the Football Conference
 Harrogate Town promoted as champions of Division One
 Ashton United promoted via 3° play-offs from Division One

League table

Results

Division One 

Division One featured four new teams:
 Bamber Bridge relegated via play-offs from Premier Division
 Bishop Auckland relegated from Premier Division
 Alfreton Town promoted as champions of the Northern Counties East League Premier Division
 Kidsgrove Athletic promoted as champions of the North West Counties League Division One

League table

Results

Play-offs
The Division One play-offs saw the third to fifth placed sides in the Division and the team that finished 21st in the Premier Division compete for one place in the Premier Division.

Promotion and relegation

In the thirty-fifth season of the Northern Premier League Accrington Stanley (as champions) were automatically promoted to the Football Conference. Gateshead, Colwyn Bay and Hyde United were relegated to the First Division; these three clubs were replaced by relegated Conference side Southport, First Division winners Alfreton Town, second placed Spennymoor United and third placed Radcliffe Borough (via a Playoff). In the First Division Eastwood Town and Trafford left the League at the end of the season and were replaced by newly admitted Bridlington Town and Prescot Cables.

Cup Results
Challenge Cup: Teams from both leagues.

Marine bt. Gateshead 3–0 on aggregate

President's Cup: 'Plate' competition for losing teams in the NPL Cup.

Stalybridge Celtic bt. Ashton United

Chairman's Cup: 'Plate' competition for losing teams in the NPL Cup.

Hucknall Town bt. Droylsden

Peter Swales Shield: Between Champions of NPL Premier Division and Winners of the NPL Cup.

Accrington Stanley bt. Marine

References

External links 
 Northern Premier League Tables at RSSSF

Northern Premier League seasons
6